Kachumesqal (also Romanized as Kachūmes̄qāl) is a village in Kachu Rural District, in the Central District of Ardestan County, Isfahan Province, Iran. At the 2006 census, its population was 332, in 118 families.

References 

Populated places in Ardestan County